Suci Rizky Andini (born 26 March 1993) is an Indonesian badminton player specializing in doubles, from the Mutiara Cardinal Bandung club. She won the girls' doubles title at the 2011 Asian Junior Championships partnered with Tiara Rosalia Nuraidah. Andini competed at the 2011 and 2014 World Championships, and also at the 2014 Asian Games.

Achievements

Southeast Asian Games 
Women's doubles

BWF World Junior Championships 
Girls' doubles

Asian Junior Championships 
Girls' doubles

BWF Grand Prix (2 runners-up) 
The BWF Grand Prix had two levels, the Grand Prix and Grand Prix Gold. It was a series of badminton tournaments sanctioned by the Badminton World Federation (BWF) and played between 2007 and 2017.

Women's doubles

  BWF Grand Prix Gold tournament
  BWF Grand Prix tournament

BWF International Challenge/Series (7 titles, 1 runner-up) 
Women's doubles

  BWF International Challenge tournament
  BWF International Series tournament

Invitational tournament 
Women's doubles

Performance timeline

National team 
 Junior level

 Senior level

Individual competitions 
 Junior level

 Senior level

References

External links 

 

1993 births
Living people
Sportspeople from Bandung
Indonesian female badminton players
Badminton players at the 2014 Asian Games
Asian Games competitors for Indonesia
Competitors at the 2015 Southeast Asian Games
Southeast Asian Games bronze medalists for Indonesia
Southeast Asian Games medalists in badminton
21st-century Indonesian women
20th-century Indonesian women